The Royal Society of Chemistry awards the designation of Honorary Fellow of the Royal Society of Chemistry for distinguished service in the field of chemistry.

Awardees are entitled to use the post nominal HonFRSC.

Recipients 
Recipients have included:

1952 
 HRH The Prince Philip, Duke of Edinburgh KG KT OM GBE HonFRSC

1980 

 Professor Elias J Corey HonFRSC ForMemRS
 Professor Manfred Eigen HonFRSC HonFRSE ForMemRS
 Professor Albert Eschenmoser HonFRSC ForMemRS
 Professor Rolf Huisgen HonFRSC
 Professor Dr Heinrich Noth HonFRSC

1983 

 Professor Gilbert Stork HonFRSC ForMemRS

1985 

 Professor Duilio G Arigoni HonFRSC ForMemRS
 Dr Reuben S Leach HonFRSC
 Professor Riley Schaeffer HonFRSC
 Sir Peter Walters HonFRSC

1986 

 Princess Chulabhorn CChem HonFRSC

1987 

 Professor Jack Halpern HonFRSC FRS
 Professor Dudley R Herschbach HonFRSC
 Professor Jean-Marie Lehn HonFRSC ForMemRS
 Sir Robert Malpas CBE HonFRSC

1989 

 Professor Chintamani N R Rao CChem HonFRSC FRS

1990 

 Dr Alfred R. Bader HonFRSC
 Dr Wolfgang Fritsche CChem HonFRSC
 Professor Corwin H Hansch HonFRSC (1918–2011)
 Professor Rudolf A Marcus HonFRSC
 Professor Federico Mayor Zaragoza HonFRSC
 Professor Oleg M Nefedov HonFRSC
 Professor John C Polanyi HonFRSC FRS

1993 

 Miss Helen P Sharman OBE CChem HonFRSC

1994 
 Dr Mary L Good CChem HonFRSC

1995 

 Professor Roald Hoffmann HonFRSC ForMemRS

1996 

 Professor Ronald C D Breslow HonFRSC FRS
 Professor Walter Kaminsky HonFRSC

1997 

 Professor Karl B Sharpless HonFRSC

1998 

 Professor Sir John Ivan George Cadogan CBE CChem HonFRSC FRSE FRS
 Sir Aaron Klug OM PRS HonFRSC HonFRSE FRS
 Professor George A Olah HonFRSC FRS
 Sir Richard Brook Sykes HonFRSC FRS
 Professor Sir John Walker HonFRSC FRS

2000 

 Professor Jack David Dunitz HonFRSC FRS
 Professor Sir Harry Kroto CChem HonFRSC HonFRSE FRS
 Professor Ryoji Noyori HonFRSC ForMemRS

2001 

 The Lord Browne of Madingley HonFRSC FRS
 Professor Richard N Zare HonFRSC ForMemRS

2002 

 Professor Henri B Kagan HonFRSC
 Sir Thomas Fulton Wilson McKillop HonFRSC FRSE FRS
 Professor Sir John Edward Sulston HonFRSC FRS
 Professor Kurt Wuthrich HonFRSC HonFRSE ForMemRS
 Professor Ahmed Hassan Zewail HonFRSC ForMemRS

Also in 2002, the fictional character Sherlock Holmes was awarded an "Extraordinary Honorary Fellowship".

2003 

 Professor Sir Richard Friend HonFRSC FRS
 Professor Sir Peter Mansfield HonFRSC FRS

2004 

 Dr Peter Agre HonFRSC
 Professor Aaron J Ciechanover HonFRSC
 Professor Harry Barkus Gray HonFRSC ForMemRS
 Professor Avram Hershko HonFRSC
 Professor Roderick MacKinnon HonFRSC
 Professor Irwin Rose HonFRSC (1926–2015)

2005 

 Mr Heston Blumenthal OBE HonFRSC
 Dr Yves Chauvin HonFRSC
 Professor Robert H Grubbs HonFRSC
 Professor Satoshi Omura HonFRSC
 Professor Richard Royce Schrock HonFRSC ForMemRS
 Professor George M Whitesides HonFRSC

2006 

 Dr Adam Hart-Davis HonFRSC
 Professor Roger D Kornberg HonFRSC FRS
 Professor Goverdhan Mehta CChem HonFRSC FRS
 Professor Teruaki Mukaiyama HonFRSC
 Professor Herbert Roesky HonFRSC
 The Lord Sainsbury of Turville HonFRSC FRS

2007 

 Professor Chunli Bai HonFRSC
 Professor Carl Djerassi HonFRSC ForMemRS (1923–2015)
 Professor Gerhard Ertl HonFRSC HonFRSE
 Professor Dieter Fenske HonFRSC
 Mr Jim Ratcliffe HonFRSC

2008 

 Professor Martin Chalfie HonFRSC
 Professor Roger Yonchien Tsien HonFRSC ForMemRS

2009 

 Professor Christian André Amatore HonFRSC
 Professor Allen Joseph Bard HonFRSC
 Dr Brian Iddon CChem HonFRSC
 Dr Venkatraman Ramakrishnan HonFRSC FRS
 Professor Thomas Arthur Steitz HonFRSC
 Professor Ada E Yonath HonFRSC

2010 

 Mr Bill Bryson OBE HonFRSC
 Professor Andre Geim HonFRSC FRS
 Professor Sir Alec Jeffreys HonFRSC FRS
 Professor Ei-ichi Negishi HonFRSC
 Professor Konstantin Novoselov HonFRSC
 Professor Sir Paul Nurse HonFRSC FRSE FRS
 Professor Akira Suzuki HonFRSC

2011 

 Dr Quentin Cooper HonFRSC
 Dr Yusuf Khwaja Hamied HonFRSC
 Dr Yuan Tseh Lee HonFRSC
 Professor Dan Shechtman HonFRSC
 Sir J Fraser Stoddart CChem HonFRSC HonFRSE FRS
 Dr Joan Selverstone Valentine HonFRSC

2012 

 Professor Brian Kobilka HonFRSC
 Professor Robert J Lefkowitz HonFRSC
 Sir Gregory P Winter CBE HonFRSC FRS

2013 

 The Lord Ballyedmond OBE, HonFRSC, FRCVS (1944–2014)
 Professor Michael Grätzel HonFRSC
 Professor Anne Glover CBE HonFRSC
 Professor Dame Julia S Higgins DBE HonFRSC FRS
 Professor Andrew B Holmes HonFRSC FRS
 Professor Martin Karplus HonFRSC
 Professor Michael Levitt HonFRSC FRS
 Professor Arieh Warshel HonFRSC
 Mr Keith Wiggins HonFRSC

2014 

 Professor Jacqueline Barton HonFRSC
 Dr Eric Betzig HonFRSC
 Professor Dr Stefan Hell HonFRSC
 Professor William Moerner HonFRSC
 Professor Bengt Norden HonFRSC
 Professor Sir Martyn Poliakoff CBE HonFRSC FRS
 Professor Dame Julia Slingo HonFRSC
 Professor Gabor Somorjai HonFRSC

2015 
 Professor Andrew D Hamilton HonFRSC FRS
 Dr Tomas R Lindahl HonFRSC
 Dr Paul L Modrich HonFRSC
 Professor Dame Carol V Robinson DBE HonFRSC FRS
 Professor Lesley J Yellowlees CBE HonFRSC FRSE

2016 
 Professor Jean-Pierre Sauvage HonFRSC
 Professor Dr Bernard L Feringa CChem HonFRSC
 Professor Dr Xinhe Bao HonFRSC
 Professor Christina Moberg HonFRSC
 Professor Dame Janet Thornton DBE HonFRSC FRS

2017 
 Professor Jacques Dubochet HonFRSC
 Dr Joachim Frank HonFRSC
 Professor Richard Henderson HonFRSC FRS
 Professor Thisbe Lindhorst HonFRSC 
 Professor Yuri Tsolakovich Oganessian HonFRSC
 Professor W Graham Richards CBE HonFRSC
 The Lord Willetts HonFRSC
 Ms Emma Walmsley HonFRSC

2018 
 Professor Juliet Gerrard HonFRSC FRSNZ
 Dr Maki Kawai HonFRSC
 Dr Fiona Marshall HonFRSC
 Professor Roger Sheldon HonFRSC FRS

2019 
 Professor Frances Arnold HonFRSC
 Professor Dr Natalia Tarasova HonFRSC
 Dr Anthony Wood HonFRSC
 Professor John B. Goodenough CChem HonFRSC ForMemRS

2020 
 Professor Emmanuel I Iwuoha CSci CChem HonFRSC
 Professor Pilar Goya Laza HonFRSC
 Professor Tebello Nyokong HonFRSC

See also 

 List of Royal Society of Chemistry medals and awards

References 

Royal Society of Chemistry
Chemistry awards